HMS Theseus was an  protected cruiser of the Royal Navy. Theseus was launched at Leamouth, London in 1892 and commissioned on 14 January 1896.

Service history

Upon commission in 1896, Theseus was part of the Special Flying Squadron, which had been formed in response to a war scare with Germany, following which she was posted to the Mediterranean Fleet.

In January 1897 Theseus was ordered from the Mediterranean to join Rear Admiral Sir Harry Rawson's fleet that had been sent to West Africa for a punitive expedition against Benin. The force was assembled off the coast of Benin by 3 February, with landings taking place on 9 February. Benin City was captured on 18 February and the force re-embarked on the ships of the fleet on 27 February. The ship's crew suffered badly from Malaria as a result of her service during the Benin expedition, and when Theseus was refitted at Chatham later that year she required a thorough disinfection.

Captain Vernon Archibald Tisdall was in command from January 1899. She served in the Mediterranean until late April 1902, when she left Malta homebound to pay off, arriving at Plymouth on 6 May, and Chatham three days later. She was paid off into the Medway Fleet Reserve on 28 May 1902.

In February 1913, Theseus joined the Queenstown Training Squadron.

When war broke out in 1914, Theseus joined the 10th Cruiser Squadron. In late August Russian forces in the Baltic captured copies of the German Navy codebook and Theseus was dispatched from Scapa Flow to Alexandrovosk in order to collect the copies offered to the British. Although she arrived on 7 September, due to mixups she did not depart until 30 September and returned to Scapa with two Russian couriers and the documents on 10 October. The books were formally handed over to the First Lord, Winston Churchill, on 13 October, and subsequently exploited by the cryptanalysts of Room 40.

Theseus was unsuccessfully attacked by the German submarine . The flotilla was ordered to proceed at full speed to the northwest in response to this attack, but no response to the order was heard from Theseuss sister ship . Hawke had been torpedoed by the German submarine  several hours earlier and had quickly capsized and sank out of sight of the rest of the flotilla. Just 70 of Hawkes 594 crew survived.

Theseus was rearmed, along with bulges to her hull, which were added to enable her to take part in the Dardanelles Campaign. In 1916 she was deployed to the Mediterranean and was then sent to the White Sea. In 1918 she was sent to the Aegean Sea to be charged with the mundane task of being a depot ship. In 1919, Theseus had her final deployment, when she was sent to the Black Sea. She returned to the UK in 1920 and was scrapped the following year in Germany.

References

Sources

 Roger Chesneau and Eugene M. Kolesnik, ed., Conway's All the World's Fighting Ships 1860–1905, (Conway Maritime Press, London, 1979),

External links

 

Edgar-class cruisers
Ships built in Leamouth
Victorian-era cruisers of the United Kingdom
World War I cruisers of the United Kingdom
1892 ships